In the National Football League, training camp refers to the time before the season commences. During this time, teams sometimes congregate at an outside location, usually a university, to conduct training camp for at least the first few weeks. This is similar to baseball's spring training.

Training camp is used in several different ways. New players and coaches use it to acclimate themselves to new teammates and systems. For younger players, it serves as a period of evaluation; for veterans, it is time to return to form.

Training camp is divided into several different components. The first is scrimmages. These are pseudogames where teams run nearly full games' worth of plays. Sometimes, two practice sessions are held on the same day. This concept is referred to as "two-a-days". Other parts of training camp include drills, meetings with coaches and other players at one's position, weight training, and preseason games.  The latter half of training camp leads directly into the exhibition season.

With NFL training camps starting in late July, the biggest concern has been dehydration. In 2001, Minnesota Vikings player Korey Stringer died of a medical condition based from dehydration and heatstroke. The death of Stringer prompted the NFL to change their training policies. At each practice, every team must have the team doctor and trainers on the field; additionally, an ambulance must be present during practices.

With NFL training camps beginning in late July, severe weather can affect practice and exhibition games. In 2002, a Cleveland Browns exhibition game ended due to lightning near Cleveland Browns Stadium, and severe storms have been known to disrupt training camps.

Fans are often able to visit their favorite team's training camp to catch an early look at the players; admission to practices is often free or substantially less expensive than a game ticket, making training camp trips a popular option for fans who cannot attend many games due to financial or other reasons. NFL teams often sell souvenirs and concessions at camp sites along with offering activities and events to make training camp a more fan-friendly experience.

Official NFL training camps should be distinguished from private training camps, often for certain tactics or positions.

Organized team activities
Recently, the NFL has let teams have off-season training sessions, officially called "organized team activities" (OTAs). Many teams use the OTAs to help develop players and make them better. These training sessions are in late May and early June. The OTAs are the only practices between the end of the previous season and the start of training camp. Players new to the NFL attend seminars and lectures organized by the NFL from mid-June to mid-July. Veteran players use the off time to sponsor football camps for children, golf outings for charity, or even some family time.

Training camp sites by team

Differences with baseball
Unlike Major League Baseball spring training, where teams congregate at locations in either Arizona or Florida (primarily for weather reasons), NFL teams are able to hold their respective training camps all over the United States. An increasing number of clubs hold camp at their year-round headquarters/practice facilities – 20 in 2015, up from only five in 2000. Most teams have abandoned remote locations to "come home" for training camp, largely for practicality reasons. Many clubs have recently constructed state-of-the-art headquarters/practice facilities, replete with amenities (multiple practice fields, indoor practice fields, weightlifting & training rooms, meeting rooms, lecture halls, film study rooms, offices, cafeteria, medical facilities, IT infrastructure, media/press conference room, etc.) that cannot be provided or matched at other distant locations (colleges, parks, etc.). Most, if not all, of these newer team headquarters were designed with hosting training camp in mind, as such, they are able to accommodate the expanded training camp roster sizes. Some even feature permanent bleachers for spectators. In addition, the cost of temporarily relocating and accommodating the entire organization to another location is substantial.

The attitudes about how to run training camp have also evolved, leading more teams to stay home. Furthermore, restrictions dictated by the CBA (with the NFLPA) limit contact and prohibit such things as two-a-days, which effectively reduce on-field activity during camp. With OTAs, minicamps, and conditioning during the off season, players remain in top physical shape year-round. The focus of training camp is no longer getting players back in shape, but more of fostering camaraderie, filling a (usually) small number of vacant roster spots, and delving immediately into game preparation.

For example, the Lions' camp was long held at Saginaw Valley State College, the Broncos trained at the University of Northern Colorado, the Patriots at Bryant University in Smithfield, Rhode Island, and Washington moved in from Dickinson College, the former site of Carlisle Indian School. Tampa Bay used to train at the University of Tampa, then at the ESPN Wide World of Sports Complex before moving permanently back to their headquarters. Similarly, after many years on the road, the Jets (SUNY Cortland) and the Giants (Albany) both recently moved back to team headquarters.

A handful of teams still use somewhat distant locations at the fringes of their markets to promote their team. For instance, the Buffalo Bills moved their training camp from SUNY Fredonia to Saint John Fisher College in suburban Rochester; as a team representing one of the smallest cities in the NFL, the holding of training camp in the nearby city of Rochester allows the Bills to lay claim to a larger portion of upstate New York, thus taking advantage of a market closer in size to other teams in the NFL (similar rationale was used for the Bills' games in Toronto, Ontario, Canada, prior to 2014). The Dallas Cowboys have historically hosted their training camp in locales very distant from their home market, even before they were given the moniker "America's Team" in the late 1970s. The Cowboys have held their training camp at the River Ridge Playing Fields in Oxnard, California, a suburb of Los Angeles, off and on since 2004. Despite the Rams returning to Southern California and the Cowboys constructing a considerable multipurpose facility in Frisco, Texas, whose main lure is being the team's practice facility, the Cowboys continue to hold the early part of their training camp in Oxnard annually. The Las Vegas Raiders, despite moving from Oakland, California, to Las Vegas in 2020 kept their training camp at the Napa Valley Marriott and Redwood Middle School in Napa, California, which they have used for training camp since 1996. The site allows the team to keep a connection to Northern California and the Bay Area fan base. 

Another difference between spring training and training camp is that true intra-squad games do not take place (anymore), though informal scrimmages are very common. Split-squad games never happen in the NFL. Fairly commonly, two teams hold a short joint camp and scrimmage at a neutral site in addition to their main camp.

References

External links
NFL Training Camp Information from NFL.com

National Football League
Training